Tiendeveen is a village in the Netherlands, in the municipality of Hoogeveen. Tiendeveen takes its name from the Dutch word for peat, "veen", which is collected there, just as in Hoogeveen and Witteveen.

References 

Populated places in Drenthe
Hoogeveen